Lukyamuzi Bashir (or Badi)(born 7 December 1986) is a Ugandan music director, film director and producer. He directed Blu*3's video Where you are featuring Goodlyfe Crew, Iryn Namubiru’s Bona Obasinga, and Vumilia by Chameleone. He also directed Goodlyfe Crew's music videos Talk n Talk, This is how we do it. He is popularly know to work with friend and artist A Pass.

Bashir is the Channel O Ugandan representative and the director of photography for the South Africa-based music TV channel and has worked on Off the Record, Introducing Keko and Lifestyle Uganda for the channel.

He directed his debut film Bala Bala Sese written by Usama Mukwaya and  featuring Ashraf Ssemwogerere.

References

External links 

 
 https://archive.today/20131008174154/http://africanpulse.co.uk/tag/ugandan-music/

Living people
Ugandan film producers
Ugandan film directors
1986 births
People from Mbarara